Khanyo Templeton Ngcukana (born 10 May 1995) is a Dutch-born South African rugby union player, currently playing with  in the Currie Cup. He can play as a winger or a fullback.

Rugby career

2011–2013 : Schoolboy rugby

Ngcukana was born in The Hague in the Netherlands, but grew up in Cape Town. He attended Rondebosch Boys' High School, representing them in the Under-16 Grant Khomo Week in 2011 and the premier high school rugby union tournament in South Africa, the Under-18 Craven Week, in 2013.

2014–2015 : Youth and Varsity Cup rugby and South Africa Under-20s

After high school, Ngcukana joined the Western Province academy and he was a member of their Under-19 squad that participated in the 2014 Under-19 Provincial Championship. He made four appearances during the regular season to help Western Province qualify for the semi-finals after finishing in third spot on the log. He scored Western Province's first try of the match in the 18th minute of the final, as his side won 33–26 to be crowned champions.

He started all eight of their matches in a season that saw them reach the semi-final stage before losing to eventual champions .

He was named in a 37-man training squad for the South Africa national under-20 rugby union team and started for them in a friendly match against a Varsity Cup Dream Team in April 2015. He was then included in the squad that embarked on a two-match tour of Argentina. He was not named in the matchday squad for their 25–22 victory over Argentina in their first match but played the full 80 minutes of a 39–28 victory in the second match four days later. Upon the team's return to South Africa, he was named in the final squad for the 2015 World Rugby Under 20 Championship in Italy. He started their 33–5 win against the hosts in their first match, but didn't feature in their 40–8 victory over Samoa in their second match. He returned to the starting lineup for final pool match against Australia, scoring one of South Africa's six tries in a 46–13 victory, and also started in their 20–28 loss to England in the semi-final. He was omitted from the squad for the third-place play-off match against France, where South Africa achieved a 31–18 win to secure third place in the competition.

He returned to domestic action for the  team during the 2015 Under-21 Provincial Championship. He appeared in every match that his team played during the season, scoring six tries – two against the Free State in Bloemfontein, one each in matches against the Leopards and Sharks and another two in a 44–38 victory over the Golden Lions in their penultimate match in the regular season. Western Province finished top of the log with ten victories in their twelve matches to qualify for the title play-offs, and Ngcukana started both their 43–20 win over the Golden Lions in the semi-finals and in their 52–17 win over Free State in the final to win a youth provincial title for the second season in a row.

2016–present : Western Province / UCT

References

South African rugby union players
Living people
1995 births
Sportspeople from The Hague
Rugby union wings
Rugby union fullbacks
Western Province (rugby union) players
South Africa Under-20 international rugby union players
Alumni of Rondebosch Boys' High School